The Bispham–Wilson Historic District (also known as the Jackson F. Bispham House) is a U.S. historic district (designated as such on September 14, 2002) located in Sarasota, Florida. The district is at 4613 South Tamiami Trail. It contains 3 historic buildings. The property was privately owned and sold. The buildings (the house was the last residential building, occupied until recently, standing on US Route 41 in Sarasota)  were torn down Friday, April 3, 2015, to make way for commercial development.

References

External links
 Sarasota County listings at National Register of Historic Places

National Register of Historic Places in Sarasota County, Florida
Historic districts on the National Register of Historic Places in Florida
Buildings and structures in Sarasota, Florida
2002 establishments in Florida